Michael Feldman is an American television producer and writer.

Some of his writing credits include The Gregory Hines Show, Everybody Loves Raymond, Temporarily Yours,  That's So Raven, Cory in the House as well as producing for Boston Common, Odd Man Out, Yes, Dear and The Weber Show.

Feldman was a head writer and executive producer for the Disney Channel sitcom Sonny with a Chance.

Personal life
Feldman currently resides in Los Angeles with his wife, Andrea, and their two sons, Ben and Zach and their dog,Wally.

References

External links

American television writers
American male television writers
American television producers
Living people
Year of birth missing (living people)
Place of birth missing (living people)